Ahammed Fazle Rabbi (Born 8 December 1980), best known as Afran Nisho, is a Bangladeshi actor. He won the critics' choice "Best Actor (TV)" at the 2016 Meril Prothom Alo Awards for his role in the TV drama Jog Biyog.

Personal life 
Nisho was born in Bhuapur, Tangail, Bangladesh on 8 December 1980.  He married Trisha in 2011 and they have one child.

Career 
Nisho began his career as a model in a television commercial in 2003.

Television

 Sukher Asukh (2008)
 Samudrajol (2009)
 Karo Kono Neeti Nai (2009)
 Premomoy Mriyoman (2010)
 Maanab Jamin (2010)
 Achena Manush (2010)
 Sabuj Nakshotro (2010)
 Rumali (2011)
 Rong Berong (2011)
 No Problem (2011)
 Dulchhe Pendulum (2011)
 Aamar Bari Tomar Bar (2011)
 Ek Poloke (2012), Ridom
 Swapnogulo Ichchemoto (2012)
 Phul + Pori= Phulpori (2012)
 Nirupama (2012)
 Dhushor Smriti Aar Shadakalo Frame (2012)
 Meghla Roddur (2012)
 Mayajaal (2012)
 Andhar-e Alo (2012)
 Props (2012)
 Bibhranti (2012)
 Dhonyobad Bhalobasha (2012), Rifat
 Turn Over (2012)
 Uttaradhikar (2012)
 Next Generation dot (2012)
 Tobuo Jibon (2013), younger brother
 Surprise (working title, 2013), Himel
 Sobuj Nokshotro (2013)
 Ghotonachokre (2013), Ayon
 Ekti Laal Saree Ebong (2013)
 Trump-card (2013)
 Joker (2013)
 Bhalobashar Kachhe Phera (2013)
 Oshomapto Bhalobasha (2013), Farhan
 Nil Ronger Golpo (2013)
 Ami Devdas Hotey Chai (2014) 
 Ek Hazar Taka
 Sombodhon Tin Prokar
 Chokher Moddhe Swapno Thake (2014)
 The Metamorphosis (2014)
 Ekti Osomapto Bhalobasha
 Let's Fly (2014)
 Ojoshro Bhul Othoba Ekti Padmo Phul (2014), Shanto
 Lotakombol (2014)
 Nilar Apomrittyu (2014), Rudro
 Obhineta (2014)
 Tin Number Haat (2014)
 Tom & Jerry (2014)
 Gollachhut (2014)
 Ekti Onakankhito Prem-er Golpo (2014)
 Agnigiri (2014)
 Na Chahiley Jaar-e Pawa Jai (2014)
 Biye Pagol (2014)
 Day Out (2014)
 Kathpoka (2014)
 Swapn-e Boshobash (2014)
 Durottwo (2014)
 Theatrewala (2014)
 Jolforing er Gann (2014)
 Aamar Stri Atotayiee (2014)
 Life & Fiona (2014)
 Bijli (2014)
 Swapney Dekha Rajkonnya (2014)
 Shukhpaskhi Agun Dana (2014)
 Apurba (2014)
 Opekkhar Photography (2015)
 Neel Chirkutey Ebong Tumi (2015)
 Break-up Break down (2015)
 Truth and Dare (2015) 
 Jibon Bodol (2015)
 Out of the World (2015)
 Agochorey Bhalobasha (2015)
 Pendulove (2015)
 Kichhuta Bhalobashar Golpo (2015)
 Abar-o Devdas (2015), Dip
 Before The Love
 Tel O Joler Galpa (2015)
 Shudhu Tor Jonno (2015)
 Kothay Pabo Tare (2015), Shimul
 12 Hours (2015)
 Akasher Thikanay (2015)
 Tribhuj Atma (2015)
 Batasher Manush (2015)
 Detective Shamsher Evong Japani Antique (2015)
 Breakup Story (2015)
 E Ek Audbhut Bhalobasha (2015)
 Din-dupurey Dinajpurey (2015)
 Sikandar Boksh Ekhon Nij Gram-e (2015)
 Perfume (2015), Sakib
 Jol Pharinger Bhalobasa (2015), Anik
 O Radha O Krishna (2015)
 Ranibala (2015)
 Chobi (2016)
 Bakshobondi (2016), boyfriend
 Neel Chokh (2016)
 Chirkut (2016)
 No Answer (2016)
 Biprotip (2016)
 Biswas Ghatak (2016)
 Ural Prem (2016)
 Tini Amader Bokor Bhai (2016)
 Shunyata (2016)
 Swapnakuhak (2016)
 Meet Me Never (2016)
 100 Out of 100 (2016)
 Ekti Tin Masher Golpo (2016)
 Red Rose (2017)
 In-Discipline (2017)
 Songsar (2017)
 Atpourey Jibon-er Golpo (2017), Afzal
 Sada Kagoje Sajano Onubhuti (2017)
 Shwashuraloy Modhuraloy (2017)
 Divorce (2017)
 Dhumketu (2017)
 Koto Shopno Koto Asha (2017)
 Teto (2017)
 Tomar Kotha Bolbo Kakey (2017)
 Honon (2017)
 Trivuj Atta (2017)
 Shunnyo Somikoron
 Somapto Golper Osomapto Oddhaya (2017)
 Pure Love
 Kath Golap (2017)
 Certificate Ferot (2017)
 Jannat (2017)
 Baak (2017)
 Ghure Daranor Golpo (2018)
 Bhai Kichu Bolte Chay (2018)
 Onuvobe (2018)
 Dear Bangladesh (2018)
 Classless Mokhless (2018)
 Shok Hok Shokti (2018)
 Cholona (2018)
 Negative Positive (2018)
 Biswas (2018)
 Putu Putu Prem (2018)
 Outsourcing O Bhalobashar Golpo (2018)
 Bra-thar (2018)
 O Jeno Amar Hoy (2018)
 Rini (2018)
 Rongin Khame Dhulo Pora Srity (2018)
 Last Friday (2018)
 Ex Girlfriend (2019)
 Nayantara (2019)
 Dream of Life (2019)
 Badman (2019)
 Appointment Letter (2019)
 Amar Bou (2019)
 Ditiyo Koishor (2019)
 Kokhono Na Kokhono (2019)
 Ex Boyfriend (2019)
 Shesh Chirkutt (2019)
 Je Golpota Bhola Hoyni (2019)
 Tom and Jerry (2019)
 Police The Real Hero (2019)
 Unexpected Surprise (2019)
 Agun (2019)
 Tom and Jerry 2 (2019)
 Bhaiya (2019)
 Lovely Wife (2019)
 The End (2019)
 Perfect Husband (2019)
 Moyuri Shock Dey (2019)
 Me & U (2019)
 Unexpected Crisis (2019)
 Khoborwala (2019)
 Win or Lose (2019)
 Ei Shohore (2019)
 Proshongshay Ponchomukh (2019)
 Bhai Prochur Kobita Bhalobashe (2019)
 Mobile Chor (2019)
 The Life of Jalil (2019)
 Only Me (2019)
 Insecurity (2019)
 Flat B2 (2019)
 Unexpected Story (2019)
 Shesh Ki Hoyechilo Shotti (2019)
 Perfect Wife (2019)
 Miss Sheuly (2019)
 Fun (2019)
 Lol (2019)
 Morichika (2020)
 Sir I Love You (2020)
 Gojodontini (2020)
 Ghore Fera (2020)
 Bhalobasha Mitthe (2020)
 Photo Frame (2020)
 Devdas Juliet (2020)
 Side Effect (2020)
 22nd April (2020)
 Ekai 100 (2020)
 Eti Maa (2020)
 Bou (2020)
 Couple Therapy (2020)
 Jonmodaag (2020)
 Muthophone (2020)
 Potongo (2020)
 Sunglass (2020
 Break Up Story (2020)
 Irina (2020)
 Hridoy Bhanga Dheu  (2020)
 Biker Helpar Hoba (2020)
 Golmorich (2021)
 Plus Four Point Five (2021) 
 Kuwasha (2021)
 Shilpi (2021)
 Majnu (2021)
 Lota Audio (2021)
 Chondopoton (2021)
 Raja (2021)
 Maroon (2021)
 Abar Bhalobashar Shad Jage (2021)
 Kaykobad (2021)
 Apon (2021)
 Chorokal Aaj (2021)
 Ditiyo Suchona (2021)
 Take Bhalobasa Bole(2021)
 Punorjonmo (2021) 
 Revenge (2021)
 Punorjonmo 2 (2021) 
 Didhadondo (2021)
 Ek Mutho Prem (2021) 
 Jui Toke Ektu Chui (2022)
 Bondhu (2022) 
 Ghatok (2022)
 Laaf (2022)
 Dhaka To Dubai (2022)
 Titlir Fire Asha (2022)
 Matinee Show (2022)
 2 by 2 love (2022)
 Paid Ghost (2022)
 Onakankhito Biye (2022)
 Hot Temper (2022)

TV series
 House No 96 (2021) 
 Idiot (2019)

Filmography

Web series

Awards and nominations

References

External links

Living people
Bangladeshi male models
Bangladeshi male television actors
People from Tangail District
Dhaka College alumni
1980 births
Best TV Actor Meril-Prothom Alo Award winners